The Lost City Hydrothermal Field, often referred to simply as Lost City, is an area of marine alkaline hydrothermal vents located on the Atlantis Massif at the intersection between the Mid-Atlantic Ridge and the Atlantis Transform Fault, in the Atlantic Ocean. It is a long-lived site of active and inactive ultramafic-hosted serpentinization, abiotically producing many simple molecules such as methane and hydrogen which are fundamental to microbial life. As such it has generated scientific interest as a prime location for investigating the origin of life on Earth and other planets similar to it.

Expedition history

The Lost City was first identified on December 4, 2000, using DSV Alvin  and ROV ArgoII on cruise AT03-60 of the RV Atlantis. The cruise lasted 34 days, during which photographs and vent chimney samples were taken.

The discovery of the Lost City prompted the National Science Foundation to fund a second, 32-day voyage (AT07-34) to the site in 2003 in order to use Alvin and the autonomous vehicle ABE with a greater emphasis on scientific sampling and creating a high-resolution bathymetric map of the vent field.

The first visit by the Integrated Ocean Drilling Program took place with Expedition 304 in late 2004, when a series of holes were drilled into the Atlantis Massif to collect large cores of rock from the site. Expedition 305 followed suit in early 2005, and 340T in 2012.

In July 2005, Lost City was explored for nine days by Hercules and Argus on the National Oceanic and Atmospheric Administration vessel Ronald H. Brown, with video streamed live to the University of Washington in Seattle. Lost City was also explored on cruise 50 of the Akademik Mstislav Keldysh, which had a greater emphasis on exploring downslope south of the vent field.  The RV Knorr sailed to the Atlantis Massif in May that year for hydroacoustic measurements of potential seismic activity. Furthermore, the French EXOMAR cruise on the vessel L'Atalante was conducted in July and August 2005 to study extremophile biodiversity in deep-ocean environments.

2015 saw a visit from the International Ocean Discovery Program Expedition 357, which emphasized drilling on the Atlantis Massif to explore off-axis circulation. A series of boreholes were left behind after cores from nine different sites were taken, which were sampled by Niskin bottles. Borehole plugs were installed on two sites to allow future endeavors to sample borehole fluids.

In July and August 2018, the French TRANSECT cruise was conducted on L'Atalante utilizing the ROV VICTOR to collect a variety of measurements and samples. The following month, American cruise AT42-01, nicknamed Return to the Lost City, was undertaken to revisit the vent field after many years, featuring many members of the original discovery team in 2000. Photographs, ambient gases, cells for cultures, rock, vent fluid, and ambient seawater samples were collected using the ROV Jason II and a CTD Niskin rosette. The mission's key objectives were to collect biological and geochemical samples for researching sources of energy for microbial life. They also followed up on the 2015 borehole expedition by attempting to sample from the drilled holes for access to residual fluids.

Geography

Lost City is located in the North Atlantic Ocean on the seafloor mountain Atlantis Massif, which is approximately the size of Mount Rainier. The site is described as a long-lived vent field, estimated to be older than 120,000 years by radiocarbon dating the oldest chimney deposits of the field. However, this is significantly younger than the age of the Atlantis Massif itself, which may be as old as two million years. The massif itself may have originated in a similar manner to many other ocean core complexes.

Lost City is a location dominated by steep cliffs to the south, chimneys, and mounds of carbonate material deposited from chimneys that collapse as they age. Breccia, gabbros, and peridotites are dominating rock types as one maneuvers away from the field, which are prone to mass wasting as the bathymetry steepens. Mass-wasting events of the past are evident by bountiful scarps on the slope of the massif. Rubble tends to accumulate at areas no steeper than 60 degrees bounding the field, and can undergo lithification depending on how far it is located from Lost City.

Of the 30 active and inactive vent chimneys, Posidon is the largest and most-studied within the vent field. The vent nicknamed Beehive, for its distinct shape upon discovery, is about one meter tall and located on the south side of Posidon. IMAX has a large flange which catches hot, escaping fluid and has a very apparent biofilm acting within it.

Other chimneys, such as Ryan and Nature to the east of Posidon, also have flange and beehive-like structures, though they are significantly smaller and vent significantly less than Posidon.

Since the location of the massif is upon a slow to ultra-slow spreading center, there is a large number of faults that run through the vent field. Many faults, especially at the south side, are high-angle normal faults that can be concealed by debris. Most of the vents found tend to run from east to west, likely due to the orientation of fault lines under the field.

They have inactive vents similar in profile to Posidon with a talus (scree) deposit separating them from the central vent field, though they have not been as actively explored. It is hypothesized from the ages of samples collected that hot fluid flow migrated from the south to the north where Posidon currently resides.

Strontium, carbon, and oxygen isotope data and radiocarbon ages document at least 30,000 years of hydrothermal activity driven by serpentinization reactions at Lost City, making Lost City older than all known black smoker vents by at least two orders of magnitude.

Geology and chemistry
Alkaline hydrothermal vents like those of Lost City are only superficially related to volcanic black smoker vents; the two types of vent are perhaps better described by their differences than their similarities. Though both types are often found near oceanic spreading centers, alkaline hydrothermal vents are not created by volcanic processes. They release methane and diatomic hydrogen into the surrounding water; they do not produce significant amounts of carbon dioxide, hydrogen sulfide, or metals, which are the major outputs of volcanic black smoker vents. The temperature and pH of water surrounding the two types of vent is also significantly different.

Mineralogy

The Atlantis Massif is described as an ultramafic oceanic core complex of the Mid-Atlantic Ridge, with upper mantle rock being exposed to seawater through faulting from tectonic extension associated with oceanic spreading centers. The spreading half-rate is approximated to about 12 mm/yr, classifying it as a slow-spreading ridge. Seismic events of Richter magnitude 4 and 4.5 have been detected at the massif.

The dominant minerals found at Lost City are ultramafic, composed primarily of olivine and pyroxene with very little silica content. Peridotite (primarily spinel harzburgite) minerals undergo serpentinization and form magnetite and serpentine minerals. Because little to no carbon dioxide or metals are released in the venting fluids, Lost City bears the appearance of a non-smoker, with few particulates to give a smoky appearance.

Once pore waters have permeated the surface and return to the surface, aragonite, brucite, and calcite chimneys are formed as calcium carbonates precipitate out of solution. Younger chimneys are primarily brucite and aragonite, being white and flaky in appearance. As vents mature, porosity decreases as precipitates clog fluid pathways. Mineral compositions change with aragonite succeeded by calcite and brucite being removed through dissolution, and the chimneys darken to a grey or brown color.

Serpentinization
Lost City is an exemplary location for the study of abiotic methanogenesis and hydrogenesis, as serpentinization reactions produce methane and hydrogen. Supplementing Fischer-Tropsch reactions;

The reactions are exothermic and warm the surrounding waters via reaction heating, though fluid temperatures are still relatively low (40°–90 °C) when compared to other hydrothermal systems. Furthermore, local pH is increased to values of over 9, which enables calcium carbonate precipitation. Since serpentinization is particularly extensive, carbon dioxide concentrations are also very low. Low temperature, carbon dioxide concentrations, as well as the low hydrogen sulfide and metal content of the plume make the vents more difficult to identify from CTD measurements or optical backscatter methods.

Biology

Lost City and other hydrothermal vent systems support vastly different lifeforms due to Lost City's unique chemistry. A variety of microorganisms live in, on, and around the vents. Methanosarcinales-like archaea form thick biofilms inside the vents where they subsist on hydrogen and methane; bacteria related to the Bacillota also live inside the vents. External to the vents, archaea, including the newly described ANME-1, and bacteria, including Pseudomonadota, oxidise methane and sulfur as their primary sources of energy.

Lost City also supports a variety of small invertebrates associated with the carbonate structures, including small corals, snails, bivalves, polychaetes, amphipods, and ostracods. Desmophyllum corals and nematode worms have been observed living on the carbonate chimneys. Other animals such as tube worms and giant clams that are abundant in typical black smoker vents, however, are absent from Lost City. A variety of crabs, shrimp, sea fans, and jellyfish have also been observed at the field.

Macrofauna are rare around the vent field, though larger organisms do visit the field on occasion. Visitors can include wreckfish, grenadiers, and even sharks.

Significance
Lost City provides geologists, chemists, and biologists a working ecosystem for the study of life in extreme environments and other processes driven by abiotic production of methane and hydrogen by serpentinisation.

Similarities to other locales
The Lost City vent field shares a number of characteristics with the Prony Bay vent field near New Caledonia in the Pacific Ocean. Both are locations of moderate temperature which produce abundant hydrogen gas and methane. Prony Bay, however, is significantly shallower (less than ) than Lost City (around ). It is host to unique biology, including the extremophile Alkaliphilus hydrothermalis.

A similar alkaline hydrothermal vent, the Strytan Hydrothermal Field, has been identified off the north coast of Iceland.

The Von Damm Vent Field found in the Caribbean Sea is also situated atop an ocean core complex.

Origin of life
Speculation has been offered that ancient versions of similar alkaline hydrothermal vents in the seas of a young Earth were the birthplace of all life, constituting the planet's original abiogenesis. The free hydrogen gas produced, metallic catalysts consistent with an iron-sulfur world theory, micro-cellular physical structure of the towers, and available hydrothermal energy might plausibly have provided an environment for the beginnings of non-photosynthetic energy cycles common to the most primitive microorganisms and organic molecule creation. Microscopic structures in such alkaline vents "show interconnected compartments that provide an ideal hatchery for the origin of life".

These alkaline hydrothermal vents also continuously generate acetyl thioesters, providing both the starting point for more complex organic molecules and the energy needed to produce them. However, this notion was rejected by Japanese researchers from Earth-Life Science Institute (ELSI), Tokyo Institute of Technology. They showed that because of the high free energy change of thioester hydrolysis and their corresponding low equilibrium constants, it is unlikely that these species could have accumulated abiotically to any significant extent in the Lost City fields.

The conditions at Lost City are of particular concern because of the different types of extremophiles present. Lost City microbes are polyextremophiles, fitting the description of alkaliphiles, moderate piezophiles, and thermophiles in an environment without sunlight. The combination of different extremophile elements suggests that Lost City organisms are more extreme than at other locations, making them particularly interesting subjects of study on the requirements for life.

Given the only requirements for serpentinization are olivine and seawater, locations like Lost City could theoretically exist on extraterrestrial bodies with liquid water such as Europa and Enceladus.

In popular culture
Lost City is featured in the Disney 3-D IMAX film Aliens of the Deep. The IMAX flange was unnamed prior to the documentary's release, but is extremely recognizable in the film and subsequently picked up the nickname of the video format played in theaters.

Lost City is also featured in episode 2 of the BBC's documentary Blue Planet II.

Gallery

Protection 

The carbonate spires of the Lost City Hydrothermal Field are on UNESCO’s protection wish list.

References

External links
The site for the original UW expedition
University of Washington, Lost City Expedition
The official page for the 2018 mission
The PMEL vents program
The InterRidge Vents Database

Hydrothermal vents
Volcanism of the Atlantic Ocean
Mid-Atlantic Ridge